The Oxford Geology Group (commonly known as OGG). is an Oxfordshire-based society for geology and the wider Earth Sciences. Founded in 1957, the Group is closely associated to the University of Oxford’s Department of Earth Sciences and is a Registered Charity (No. 1175367). The Group runs a variety of activities including lecture series and colloquia, and geological field meetings. Its membership is broad and includes students, and both amateur and professional geologists.

History 
The Oxford Geology Group was founded in January 1957 in the Department of Geology and Mineralogy (now Department of Earth Sciences) at the University of Oxford by a group of academics and amateur geologists. The first president of the Group was Lawrence Wager, a professor of geology at the university.

Activities 
OGG holds two regular lecture series named after eminent Oxford geologists, the Buckland Lectures with an emphasis on applied and economic geology, and the Wager Lectures with a focus on academic geological research. Lectures are held at the Department of Earth Sciences. The Group holds an annual Oxford Colloquium, generally hosted at the Oxford Museum of Natural History or the Saïd Business School. The OGG field programme includes six annual 'georambles' (light thematic walks on local geology), as well as more intensive field meetings across the UK and abroad.

OGG also supports undergraduates in the Department of Earth Sciences through bursaries for fieldwork

See also 
 Lawrence Wager
Michael Winterbottom (academic)

References 

Geology organizations
Scientific organizations established in 1957
1957 establishments in England
Organisations based in Oxford